The Forteau Formation is a geologic formation in Newfoundland and Labrador. It preserves fossils dating back to the Cambrian period.

Age 
A Dyerian trilobite fauna places it predominantly in the Bonnia‒Olenellus trilobite zone

Fauna 
Among its fauna are small carbonaceous fossils and brachiopods  and trilobites

See also

 List of fossiliferous stratigraphic units in Newfoundland and Labrador

References
 

Cambrian Newfoundland and Labrador
Cambrian southern paleotemperate deposits